Frank Woodruff (1906–1983) was an American film director of the 1940s. He also produced and directed a number of episodes of the television show The Bigelow Theatre in the early 1950s.

Filmography
 Curtain Call (1940)
 Wildcat Bus (1940)
 Cross-Country Romance (1940)
 Lady Scarface (1941)
 Play Girl (1941)
 Repent at Leisure (1941)
 Cowboy in Manhattan (1943)
 Pistol Packin' Mama (1943)
 Two Señoritas from Chicago (1943)
 Lady, Let's Dance (1944)

References

Bibliography
 Fetrow, Alan G. Feature Films, 1940-1949: a United States Filmography. McFarland, 1994.

External links

1906 births
1983 deaths
American film directors
People from Columbia, South Carolina